Springfield is a suburb of the Central Coast region of New South Wales, Australia  east of Gosford's central business district via The Entrance Road. It is part of the  local government area. The state electoral seat is held in Gosford and Terrigal, for the federal division of Robertson.

References

Suburbs of the Central Coast (New South Wales)